Gurdwārā Bābā Aṭṭal Rai (Punjabi pronunciation: [ɡʊɾᵊd̪ʊäːɾäː bäːbäː əʈʈəɭᵊ],) is a famous Gurdwara in Amritsar. dedicated to Atal Rai, a son of Guru Hargobind and Mata Nanaki. It is just a short walk from the famous Harmandir Sahib.

History
Built some four centuries ago, the Baba Atal Gurdwara is a touching commemoration of the young life of Baba Atal Rai (1619–1628), the son of Guru Hargobind. Its nine stories echo his nine years of life before his death in 1628. According to Sikh legend narrated in the Gurbilas Chhevin Patshahi, Atal Rai revived a friend named Mohan who was bitten by a snake and subsequently died as a result of the injury. Upon hearing the news of the event, his father was displeased as miracles are rebuked by the Sikh gurus. After being admonished by his father for the miracle, Atal Rai retired himself to the bank of Kaulsar and left this mortal coil on 13 September 1628. The tower was built in his memory and to commemorate his short life. Initially a small samadhi (Indic cenotaph) was constructed at the site, which eventually transformed into a gurdwara. It was during the time of Maharaja Ranjit Singh that the present-day, nine-story tower was constructed.

Artwork 
The tower contains many mural paintings of important figures and events from Sikh history. Especially numerous are artwork relating to the life of Guru Nanak, as relayed in the Janamsakhi literature. According to Satpal Danish, the artwork had originally been commissioned and completed during Sikh-rule. Unfortunately, many of the paintings have been damaged or decayed in the decades since Indian independence due to apathy to them or deliberate defacement. Historical frescoes have been whitewashed or covered by bathroom tiles and plaster during supposed "kar seva" renovations in the structure.

Gallery

References

External links

 Gurdwara Baba Atal Rai, Amritsar
 Gurudwara Baba Atal 

Gurdwaras in Punjab, India
Buildings and structures in Amritsar
Tourist attractions in Amritsar
17th-century gurdwaras